Kurth may refer to:

People
 Charles J. Kurth (1862-1896), American lawyer and politician
 Don Kurth (b. 1949), American politician
 Ernst Kurth (1886-1946), Swiss music theorist
 Godefroid Kurth (1847-1916), Belgian historian
 James Kurth (b. ? ), Claude Smith Professor of Political Science at Swarthmore College, United States
 Jean-Pierre Kurth, Swiss para-alpine skier
 Joe Kurth (1914 - ? ), American football player
 Markus Kurth (footballer) (b. 1973), German footballer (soccer player)
 Markus Kurth (politician) (b. 1966), German politician
 Monica Kurth, American politician
 Rob Kurth (b. ? ), American punk rock drummer in the band Face to Face (punk band)
 Ronald J. Kurth (b. ? ), United States Navy admiral
 Wally Kurth (b. 1958), American singer and television performer

Companies
 Andrews Kurth, Houston, Texas-based law firm
 Kurth Brewery, located in Columbus, Wisconsin and operated from 1859 to 1949

Places
 Kurth, Wisconsin, United States, ghost town